The following highways are numbered 521:

Canada
 Alberta Highway 521

United States
 U.S. Route 521
 Maryland Route 521
 County Route 521 (New Jersey)
 Ohio State Route 521
 Puerto Rico Highway 521
 South Carolina Highway 521